Bogusław Zychowicz (born 18 May 1961) is a Polish butterfly swimmer. He competed in two events at the 1980 Summer Olympics.

References

External links
 

1961 births
Living people
Polish male butterfly swimmers
Olympic swimmers of Poland
Swimmers at the 1980 Summer Olympics
People from Mielec
20th-century Polish people